The Architectural Association School of Architecture in London, commonly referred to as the AA, is the oldest private school of architecture in the UK and one of the most prestigious and competitive in the world. Its wide-ranging programme of exhibitions, lectures, symposia and publications have given it a central position in global discussions and developments within contemporary architectural culture.

History

The Architectural Association was founded in 1847 as an alternative to the practice of training aspiring young men by apprenticeship to established architects. This practice offered no guarantee for educational quality or professional standards, and there was a belief that the system was open to vested interests, abuse, dishonesty and incompetence.

This situation led two articled pupils, Robert Kerr (1823–1904) and Charles Gray (1827/28–1881), to propose a systematic course of training provided by the students themselves.
Following a merger with the already existing Association of Architectural Draughtsmen, the first formal meeting under the name of the Architectural Association took place in May 1847 at Lyons Inn Hall, London. Kerr became the first president, 1847–48. From 1859 the AA shared premises at 9 Conduit Street with the Royal Institute of British Architects, later (1891) renting rooms in Great Marlborough Street.

The AA School was formally established in 1890. In 1901, it changed premises to the former Royal Architectural Museum in Tufton Street, Westminster. In 1917 it moved again, to its current location in Bedford Square, central London. It has since acquired additional London premises in John Street, property on Morwell Street behind Bedford Square, and a  site at Hooke Park in Dorset.

The AA is one of the world's most international and prestigious schools of architecture, attracting and selecting students and staff from more than 60 countries worldwide, with a long list of visiting critics, lecturers and other participants from around the world each year. The students of the AA have been addressed by many eminent figures, from John Ruskin and George Gilbert Scott in the 19th century, to more recently Richard Rogers, an alumnus of the school.

In November 2017, the AA was reported to be planning to make 16 staff redundant, including the whole of its publications and exhibitions departments. Shortly before, the AA had announced it was seeking a new director, to be appointed by March 2018, following the departure of Brett Steele announced in December 2016.

The first female director of the AA was Eva Franch i Gilabert, appointed in 2018 (succeeding interim director Samantha Hardingham). Following votes of no confidence in her leadership, Franch was fired in July 2020 for "failure to develop and implement a strategy and maintain the confidence of the AA School Community which were specific failures of performance against clear objectives outlined in the original contract of employment." Her dismissal came despite support from academics who wrote an open letter talking of "systemic biases" against women and of sexism, and accusing the AA of using "the pandemic for anti-democratic purposes". Architectural magazine Dezeen reported tutor and alumni views that the failure to investigate allegations of bullying and sexism had damaged both the AA school and the architecture profession, leaving "a cloud over the school". The AA began seeking a successor to Franch in December 2021, shortlisting candidates in March 2022. In May 2022, the school announced Ingrid Schroder would be its new director from August 2022.

Women at the AA

Women were first admitted as students to the AA School during World War I in 1917, almost 20 years after the RIBA had admitted its first female member, Ethel Charles, who, with her sister Bessie, had been refused entry to the AA school in 1893. Ruth Lowy, Winifred Ryle, Irene Graves and Gillian Harrison (nee Cooke) were some of the first women to enter the AA, hitherto a solely male school. In the post World War II period several women architects, writers and journalists attended courses ("classes and sets") at the AA, including Su Brumwell (Susan Miller / Rogers), Eldred Evans, Margo Griffin, Zaha Hadid, Patti Hopkins, Samantha Hardingham, Sally Mackereth, Mya Anastasia Manakides, Janet Street-Porter, Carolyn Trevor, Susan Wheeler and Georgie Walton.

The position of women at the AA was highlighted and investigated during a year-long programme of celebration in 2017, AAXX, marking the centenary of the first women's entry to the school. A book, AA Women in Architecture 1917–2017, edited by Elizabeth Darling and Lynne Walker, was published.

Curriculum
Courses are divided into two main areas – undergraduate programmes, leading to the AA Diploma (RIBA/ARB Part 2), and postgraduate programmes, which include specialised courses in Landscape Urbanism (LU), Housing and Urbanism, Sustainable Environmental Design, Histories and Theories, Emergent Technologies, and Design Research Lab (DRL). Other programmes include Projective Cities, Design + Make, and Interprofessional studio. Since its foundation, the school has continued to draw its teaching staff from progressive international practices, and they are reappointed annually, allowing a continual renewal of the exploration of architectural graphics and polemical formalism.

Independent status
The school sits outside the state-funded university system and UCAS application system. As an independent school, the AA does not participate in university rankings.

The AA enrolls a higher proportion of students from overseas compared to other architecture schools in the UK.

Bookshop and publications
The AA Bookshop has a wide collection of architectural literature  and is used as a platform for AA's own publications. AA Publications has a long tradition of publishing architects, artists and theorists early in their careers, as well as occasionally publishing figures who have already gained notoriety in other fields of expertise, such as Salman Rushdie. AA Publications produces the journal, AA Files, and the AA Book, known as the Projects Review, which annually documents the work undertaken by members of the school from Foundation to Graduate programmes. AA publications are designed and edited by the AA Print Studio, originally established in 1971 as part of the Communications Unit directed by Dennis Crompton of Archigram. The school had its own independent radio station.

Gallery

Notable alumni

Will Alsop (Stirling Prize, 2000)
Stanley Amis (1924–2021)
Ron Arad
Herbert Baker
Geoffrey Bawa
Elisabeth Benjamin
Ben van Berkel
Susanne Bier
Christopher Bowerbank
Margaret Justin Blanco White
Peter Blundell Jones
Habib Fida Ali (architect) 1935-2017 (Sitara-i-Imtiaz, 2017)
Neave Brown (RIBA Royal Gold Medal 2018)
Elizabeth Chesterton
David Chipperfield (Stirling Prize, 2007)
Nigel Coates
Sir Peter Cook
Edward Cullinan
Minnette De Silva
Carmen Dillon
Jeremy Dixon
Sir Philip Dowson
Jane Drew
Frank Duffy
Robin Evans
Kathryn Findlay
Mark Fisher
Kenneth Frampton
John Frazer
Tony Fretton
Stephen Gardiner
Marco Goldschmied
Frei Otto
Ruth Gollancz
Hansjörg Göritz (Kunstpreis Berlin Baukunst, 1996; American Academy in Rome Affiliated Fellow, 2013)
Piers Gough
Johnny Grey
Sir Nicholas Grimshaw
Dame Zaha Hadid (Pritzker Prize, 2004; Stirling Prize, 2010, 2011)
Timothy Han
Thomas Hardy
Frank Harmon
Gillian Harrison
Ranulph Glanville
Fergus Henderson
Michael Ulrich Hensel
Manuel Herz
Steven Holl
Michael Hopkins
Patty Hopkins
Bill Howell (1922-1974)
Gillian Howell (1927–2000)
Dorothy Hughes
Maxwell Hutchinson
Louisa Hutton
A. R. Hye

Mazharul Islam
Sir Geoffrey Jellicoe
Edward Jones
Robert Furneaux Jordan
Gerhard Kallmann
Shiu-Kay Kan
Ram Karmi (Israel Prize, 2002)
Ada Karmi-Melamede (Israel Prize, 2007)
Rem Koolhaas (Pritzker Prize, 2000)
Nicholas Williams 
Denys Lasdun
Judith Ledeboer
Steffen Lehmann
Amanda Levete
C.J. Lim
Edward Prentice Mawson
Ann MacEwen
Sally Mackereth
James MacLaren
Mary Medd
Edna Mosley
Mohsen Mostafavi
Herbert Muschamp
Nicolai Ouroussoff
Neri Oxman
John Pawson
Marian Pepler
Philip Powell
Janet Street-Porter
Cedric Price
Keith Raywood
Raj Rewal
Richard Rogers (Pritzker Prize, 2007; Stirling Prize, 2006, 2009)
Diana Rowntree
Winifred Ryle
Elisabeth Sakellariou
Peter Salter
Matthias Sauerbruch
Ole Scheeren
Elisabeth Scott
Denise Scott Brown
Nasrine Seraji
Dennis Sharp
William Tatton Brown
Quinlan Terry
John F. C. Turner
Jaqueline Tyrwhitt
Michael Ventris
Eyal Weizman
Clive Wilkinson
John Winter
John Worthington
Roger Zogolovitch

Former directors
Howard Robertson (1929–35)
Alvin Boyarsky (1971–90)
Alan Balfour (1991–95)
Mohsen Mostafavi (1995–2004)
Brett Steele (2005–2017)
Samantha Hardingham (interim, 2017–18)
Eva Franch i Gilabert (2018–2020)

Notable current and former teachers

Abalos & Herreros
Virgil Abloh
David Adjaye
Will Alsop
Wiel Arets
Ben van Berkel
Tatiana Bilbao
Alison Brooks 
Reg Butler
Nigel Coates
Mark Cousins
Keith Critchlow
Robin Evans
David Greene
Terry Farrell
Jane Hughes Fawcett
Mark Fisher
Earl Flansburgh
John Frazer
Ranulph Glanville
Mike Gold
James Gowan
Zaha Hadid
Michael Ulrich Hensel
Charles Hutton
Louisa Hutton
Robert Furneaux Jordan
Jeff Kipnis
Leon Krier

Rem Koolhaas
Arthur Korn
Daniel Libeskind
Mohsen Mostafavi
Farshid Moussavi
Gordon Pask
Alberto Pérez-Gómez
Cedric Price
Philippe Rahm
Jasia Reichardt
Ian Ritchie
Nathalie Rozencwajg
Makoto Saito
Peter Salter
Matthias Sauerbruch
Patrik Schumacher
Nasrine Seraji
Dennis Sharp
Bahram Shirdel
Peter Smithson
John Summerson
John F. C. Turner
Bernard Tschumi
Leon van Schaik
Dalibor Vesely
Ken Yeang
Alejandro Zaera-Polo
Elia Zenghelis

References

Further reading
 John Summerson, The Architectural Association 1847–1947 (London: Pleiades Books, 1947).

External links

Bedford Press
AA Publications

 
Educational institutions established in 1847
Education in the London Borough of Camden
Professional education in London
1847 establishments in England
Private schools in London
Architecture schools in the United Kingdom